The Liberty Bell Classic was conceived in 1992 as a way for local Philadelphia-area Division I colleges to compete against each other in a tournament, as well as an opportunity for the schools to play on the big league field of Veterans Stadium. The original eight schools were Drexel University, La Salle University, Saint Joseph's University, Temple University, University of Delaware, University of Pennsylvania, Villanova University, and West Chester University. In the first championship game, Delaware defeated Villanova 6–2.

When West Chester was reclassified as Division II, it was replaced by Rider University, which was then in turn replaced by Lehigh University. When Drexel's baseball program was dissolved after the 2003 season, Lafayette College joined the Liberty Bell Classic.

Originally all games were played at Veterans Stadium but with the closure of Veterans Stadium, starting in 2004, games are now played at local venues with the championship game being held at Citizens Bank Park. The first championship at Citizens Bank Park was claimed by Lehigh as they defeated Villanova 11–3.

A second tournament, the Bill Giles Invitational, was created in 2001 for the Philadelphia-area Division II colleges.  Competing in the Giles Invitational is previous Liberty Bell competitor West Chester University, along with Philadelphia University, University of the Sciences, and Wilmington University.  The championship games for the Bill Giles Invitational and Liberty Bell Classic are hosted as part of a double header.

Champions

1992 – Delaware
1993 – Drexel
1994 – Delaware
1995 – Delaware
1996 – Temple
1997 – Delaware
1998 – Villanova
1999 – Villanova
2000 – Temple
2001 – Delaware
2002 – Delaware
2003 – Temple
2004 – Lehigh
2005 – Villanova
2006 – La Salle
2007 – Lafayette
2008 – Lafayette
2009 – (no champion, due to inclement weather)
2010 – Delaware
2011 – Villanova
2012 – Saint Joseph's
2013 – Delaware
2014 – Saint Joseph's
2015 – Rider
2016 – Saint Joseph's
2017 – La Salle
2018 – Lafayette
2019 – Lafayette
2020 – (no champion, due to COVID-19 pandemic)
2021 – (no champion, due to COVID-19 pandemic)

Championships by school
8 – Delaware
4 – Villanova
3 – Saint Joseph's
3 – Temple
2 – La Salle
2 – Lafayette
1 – Lehigh
1 – Drexel
1 – Rider
0 – Penn
0 – West Chester

Bill Giles Invitational
The Bill Giles Invitational (BGI)—named for Philadelphia Phillies chairman emeritus Bill Giles—was begun in 2001, for the NCAA Division II baseball teams in the Philadelphia area.

BGI champions
See footnote.

2001 – Philadelphia
2002 – Philadelphia
2003 – West Chester
2004 – West Chester
2005 – West Chester
2006 – West Chester
2007 – Wilmington
2008 – West Chester
2009 – West Chester
2010 – West Chester
2011 – West Chester
2012 – West Chester
2013 – Philadelphia 
2014 – Wilmington
2015 – West Chester
2016 – West Chester
2017 – West Chester
2018 – Wilmington
2019 – Wilmington
2020 – (no champion, due to COVID-19 pandemic)
2021 – (no champion, due to COVID-19 pandemic)
2022 – West Chester

BGI championships by school
 13 – West Chester
 4 – Wilmington
 3 – Philadelphia
 0 – University of the Sciences

References

External links

Bill Giles Invitational official webpage

Baseball competitions in Philadelphia
College baseball tournaments in the United States
NCAA Division I baseball
1992 establishments in Pennsylvania
Recurring sporting events established in 1992
Delaware Fightin' Blue Hens baseball
Drexel Dragons baseball
Lafayette Leopards baseball
Lehigh Mountain Hawks baseball
Penn Quakers baseball
Rider Broncs baseball
Saint Joseph's Hawks baseball
Temple Owls baseball
Villanova Wildcats baseball
West Chester Golden Rams baseball